Behaalotecha, Beha'alotecha, Beha'alothekha, or Behaaloscha ( — Hebrew for "when you step up," the 11th word, and the first distinctive word, in the parashah) is the 36th weekly Torah portion (parashah) in the annual Jewish cycle of Torah reading and the third in the Book of Numbers. The parashah tells of the Menorah in the Tabernacle, the consecration of the Levites, the Second Passover, how pillars of cloud and fire led the Israelites, the silver trumpets, how the Israelites set out on their journeys, the complaints of the Israelites, and how Miriam and Aaron questioned Moses. The parashah comprises . It is made up of 7,055 Hebrew letters, 1,840 Hebrew words, 136 verses, and 240 lines in a Torah Scroll (Sefer Torah).

Jews generally read it in late May or in June. As the parashah sets out some of the laws of Passover, Jews also read part of the parashah, as the initial Torah reading for the last intermediate day (Chol HaMoed) of Passover.

Readings

First reading — Numbers 8:1–14
In the first reading (aliyah), God told Moses to tell Aaron to mount the seven lamps so as to give light to the front of the Menorah in the Tabernacle, and Aaron did so. God told Moses to cleanse the Levites by sprinkling on them water of purification, and making them shave their whole bodies and wash their clothes. Moses was to assemble the Israelites around the Levites and cause the Israelites to lay their hands upon the Levites. Aaron was to designate the Levites as a wave offering from the Israelites. The Levites were then to lay their hands in turn upon the heads of two bulls, one as a sin offering and the other as a burnt offering, to make expiation for the Levites.

Second reading — Numbers 8:15–26
In the second reading (aliyah), the Levites were qualified for the service of the Tent of Meeting, in place of the firstborn of the Israelites. God told Moses that Levites aged 25 to 50 were to work in the service of the Tent of Meeting, but after age 50 they were to retire and could stand guard but not perform labor.

Third reading — Numbers 9:1–14
In the third reading (aliyah), at the beginning of the second year following the Exodus from Egypt, God told Moses to have the Israelites celebrate Passover at its set time. But some men were unclean because they had had contact with a corpse and could not offer the Passover sacrifice on the set day. They asked Moses and Aaron how they could participate in Passover, and Moses told them to stand by while he listened for God's instructions. God told Moses that whenever Israelites were defiled by a corpse or on a long journey on Passover, they were to offer the Passover offering on the 14th day of the second month—a month after Passover—otherwise in strict accord with the law of the Passover sacrifice. But if a man who was clean and not on a journey refrained from offering the Passover sacrifice, he was to be cut off from his kin.

Fourth reading — Numbers 9:15–10:10
In the fourth reading (aliyah), starting the day that the Tabernacle was set up, a cloud covered the Tabernacle by day, and a fire rested on it by night. Whenever the cloud lifted from the Tent, the Israelites would follow it until the cloud settled, and there the Israelites would make camp and stay as long as the cloud lingered. God told Moses to have two silver trumpets made to summon the community and to set it in motion. Upon long blasts of the two horns, the whole community was to assemble before the entrance of the Tent of Meeting. Upon the blast of one, the chieftains were to assemble. Short blasts directed the divisions encamped on the east to move forward, and a second set of short blasts directed those on the south to move forward. As well, short blasts were to be sounded when the Israelites were at war against an aggressor who attacked them, and the trumpets were to be sounded on joyous occasions, Festivals, new moons, burnt offerings, and sacrifices of well-being.

Fifth reading — Numbers 10:11–34
In the fifth reading (aliyah), in the second month of the second year, the cloud lifted from the Tabernacle and the Israelites set out on their journeys from the wilderness of Sinai to the wilderness of Paran. Moses asked Hobab son of Reuel the Midianite to come with the Israelites, promising to be generous with him, but he replied that he would return to his native land. Moses pressed him again, noting that he could serve as the Israelites' guide. They marched three days distance from Mount Sinai, with the Ark of the Covenant in front of them, and God's cloud above them by day.

Sixth reading — Numbers 10:35–11:29

The sixth reading (aliyah) records two prayers of Moses: when the Ark was to set out, Moses would say: "Advance, O Lord! May Your enemies be scattered, and may Your foes flee before You!" and when it halted, he would say: "Return, O Lord, You who are Israel's myriads of thousands!"  In a scroll, these two verses are buttressed by inverted/backward 's.  

The people took to complaining bitterly before God, and at Taberah God ravaged the outskirts of the camp with fire until Moses prayed, and then the fire died down. The riffraff in their midst (asafsuf—compare the "mixed multitude," , erev rav of ) felt a gluttonous craving and the Israelites complained, "If only we had meat to eat! Moses in turn complained to God, "Why have You ... laid the burden of all this people upon me? God told Moses to gather 70 elders, so that God could come down and put some of the spirit that rested on Moses upon them, so that they might share the burden of the people. And God told Moses to tell the people to purify themselves, for the next day they would eat meat. But Moses questioned how enough flocks, herds, or fish could be found to feed 600,000. God answered: "Is there a limit to the Lord's power?" Moses gathered the 70 elders, and God came down in a cloud, spoke to Moses, and drew upon the spirit that was on Moses and put it upon the elders. When the spirit rested upon them, they spoke in ecstasy, but did not continue. Eldad and Medad had remained in camp, yet the spirit rested upon them, and they spoke in ecstasy in the camp. When a youth reported to Moses that Eldad and Medad were acting the prophet in the camp, Joshua called on Moses to restrain them. But Moses told Joshua: "Would that all the Lord's people were prophets, that the Lord put His spirit upon them!"

Seventh reading — Numbers 11:30–12:16
In the seventh reading (aliyah), a wind from God then swept quail from the sea and strewed them all around the camp at a place called Kibroth Hattaavah (Graves of Craving), and the people gathered quail for two days. While the meat was still between their teeth, God struck the people with a plague.

Miriam and Aaron spoke against Moses, saying: "He married a Cushite woman!" and "Has the Lord spoken only through Moses? Has He not spoken through us as well?" God heard and called Moses, Aaron, and Miriam to come to the Tent of Meeting. God came down in cloud and called out to Aaron and Miriam: "When a prophet of the Lord arises among you, I make Myself known to him in a vision, I speak with him in a dream. Not so with My servant Moses; he is trusted throughout My household. With him I speak mouth to mouth, plainly and not in riddles, and he beholds the likeness of the Lord. How then did you not shrink from speaking against My servant Moses!" As the cloud withdrew, Miriam was stricken with snow-white scales. Moses cried out to God, "O God, pray heal her!" But God said to Moses, "If her father spat in her face, would she not bear her shame for seven days? Let her be shut out of camp for seven days." And the people waited until she rejoined the camp.

Readings according to the triennial cycle
Jews who read the Torah according to the triennial cycle of Torah reading read the parashah according to the following schedule:

In inner-Biblical interpretation
The parashah has parallels or is discussed in these Biblical sources:

Numbers chapter 8
This is the pattern of instruction and construction of the Tabernacle and its furnishings:

 refers to duties of the Levites.  reports that Levites taught the law.  reports that they served as judges. And  reports that they blessed God's name. 1 Chronicles  reports that of 38,000 Levite men age 30 and up, 24,000 were in charge of the work of the Temple in Jerusalem, 6,000 were officers and magistrates, 4,000 were gatekeepers, and 4,000 praised God with instruments and song.  reports that King David installed Levites as singers with musical instruments, harps, lyres, and cymbals, and  reports that David appointed Levites to minister before the Ark, to invoke, to praise, and to extol God. And  reports at the inauguration of Solomon's Temple, Levites sang dressed in fine linen, holding cymbals, harps, and lyres, to the east of the altar, and with them 120 priests blew trumpets.  reports that Levites of the sons of Kehath and of the sons of Korah extolled God in song. Eleven psalms identify themselves as of the Korahites.

Numbers chapter 9

Passover

 refers to the Festival of Passover. In the Hebrew Bible, Passover is called:
"Passover" (Pesach);
"The Feast of Unleavened Bread" (Chag haMatzot); and
"A holy convocation" or "a solemn assembly" (mikrah kodesh).

Some explain the double nomenclature of "Passover" and "Feast of Unleavened Bread" as referring to two separate feasts that the Israelites combined sometime between the Exodus and when the Biblical text became settled.  and  indicate that the dedication of the firstborn also became associated with the festival.

Some believe that the "Feast of Unleavened Bread" was an agricultural festival at which the Israelites celebrated the beginning of the grain harvest.

"Passover," on the other hand, was associated with a thanksgiving sacrifice of a lamb, also called "the Passover," "the Passover lamb," or "the Passover offering."

Some believe that the propinquity of the dates of the two Festivals led to their confusion and merger.

 and 27 link the word "Passover" (Pesach) to God's act to "pass over" (pasach) the Israelites' houses in the plague of the firstborn. In the Torah, the consolidated Passover and Feast of Unleavened Bread thus commemorate the Israelites' liberation from Egypt.

The Hebrew Bible frequently notes the Israelites' observance of Passover at turning points in their history.  reports God's direction to the Israelites to observe Passover in the wilderness of Sinai on the anniversary of their liberation from Egypt.  reports that upon entering the Promised Land, the Israelites kept the Passover on the plains of Jericho and ate unleavened cakes and parched corn, produce of the land, the next day.  reports that King Josiah commanded the Israelites to keep the Passover in Jerusalem as part of Josiah's reforms, but also notes that the Israelites had not kept such a Passover from the days of the Biblical judges nor in all the days of the kings of Israel or the kings of Judah, calling into question the observance of even Kings David and Solomon. The more reverent , however, reports that Solomon offered sacrifices on the Festivals, including the Feast of Unleavened Bread. And  reports King Hezekiah's observance of a second Passover anew, as sufficient numbers of neither the priests nor the people were prepared to do so before then. And  reports that the Israelites returned from the Babylonian captivity observed Passover, ate the Passover lamb, and kept the Feast of Unleavened Bread seven days with joy.

Numbers chapter 10
In , the Israelites were instructed to blow upon their trumpets to be "remembered before the Lord" and delivered from their enemies.

Numbers chapter 12

And later, God used the term to refer to Caleb, Moses, David, Isaiah, Eliakim, son of Hilkiah, Israel, Nebuchadnezzar, Zerubbabel, the Branch, and Job.

The Hebrew Bible reports skin disease (tzara'at) and a person affected by skin disease (metzora) at several places, often (and sometimes incorrectly) translated as "leprosy" and "a leper." In , to help Moses to convince others that God had sent him, God instructed Moses to put his hand into his bosom, and when he took it out, his hand was "leprous (m'tzora'at), as white as snow." In , the Torah sets out regulations for skin disease (tzara'at) and a person affected by skin disease (metzora). In , after Miriam spoke against Moses, God's cloud removed from the Tent of Meeting and "Miriam was leprous (m'tzora'at), as white as snow." In , Moses warned the Israelites in the case of skin disease (tzara'at) diligently to observe all that the priests would teach them, remembering what God did to Miriam. In , part of the haftarah for parashah Tazria, the prophet Elisha cures Naaman, the commander of the army of the king of Aram, who was a "leper" (metzora). In , part of the haftarah for parashah Metzora, the story is told of four "leprous men" (m'tzora'im) at the gate during the Arameans' siege of Samaria.

In classical rabbinic interpretation
The parashah is discussed in these rabbinic sources from the era of the Mishnah and the Talmud:

Numbers chapter 8
Rabbi Levi taught that God gave the section of the lights of the Menorah, on the day that the Israelites set up the Tabernacle. The Gemara reported that Rabbi Joḥanan interpreted , "Take this book of the law," to refer to the time after the Torah had been joined together from its several parts. And the Gemara suggested that Resh Lakish interpreted , "in a roll of the book written of me," to indicate that the whole Torah is called a "roll," as  says, "And he said to me, 'What do you see?' And I answered, 'I see a flying roll.'" Or perhaps, the Gemara suggested, it is called "roll" for the reason given by Rabbi Levi, who said that God gave eight sections of the Torah, which Moses then wrote on separate rolls, on the day on which the Tabernacle was set up.

Rabbi Simeon reported that when he went to Rome, he saw the Menorah there, and all the lamps faced the middle lamp.

Rava also read  to say that the seven lamps gave light toward the center of the Menorah, and deduced from this that the middle in a series may be favored.  Rava taught that if the first Torah reader on a weekday reads four verses of the obligatory ten verses read on weekdays, that reader is to be commended; if the second (middle) reader reads four verses, that reader is to be commended; and if the third (last) reader reads four verses, that reader is to be commended.  In support of the proposition that one should commend the middle reader if that reader reads four verses, Rava taught that  says that the lights were made to face the western lamp — the middle lamp of the Menorah — and the western lamp faced the Divine Presence; and Rabbi Joḥanan taught that this shows that the middle one is specially prized.

The Sifre taught that  reports, "And Aaron did so," to tell of Aaron's virtue, for he did exactly what Moses told him to do.

The Mishnah taught that there was a stone in front of the Menorah with three steps on which the priest stood to trim the lights. The priest left the oil jar on the second step. Reading  to say, "he set up the lamps," the Sifre taught that Aaron made these steps.

The Gemara concluded that the verse required the craftsmen to beat the Menorah from a single piece of metal, but not so the trumpets.

A Midrash deduced from the use of the word "this" in  that the work of the Menorah was one of four things that God had to show Moses with God's finger because Moses was puzzled by them. Similarly, Rabbi Hiyya bar Abba said in the name of Rabbi Joḥanan that the angel Gabriel girded himself with a worker's apron and showed Moses the work of the Menorah, for  says, "And this was the work of the Menorah." (The word "this" implying that something was held up to illustrate the instructions given.)

A Midrash explained why the consecration of the Levites in  followed soon after the presentation of the twelve tribes' offerings in  The Midrash noted that while the twelve tribes presented offerings at the dedication of the altar, the tribe of Levi did not offer anything. The Levites thus complained that they had been held back from bringing an offering for the dedication of the altar. The Midrash compared this to the case of a king who held a feast and invited various craftsmen, but did not invite a friend of whom the king was quite fond. The friend was distressed, thinking that perhaps the king harbored some grievance against him. But when the feast was over, the king called the friend and told him that while the king had made a feast for all the citizens of the province, the king would make a special feast with the friend alone, because of his friendship.

If the person stands the trial, God raises the person to high rank. The Midrash found this to have been the case with Abraham, Isaac, Jacob, and Joseph, and so also with the tribe of Levi. The Midrash taught that the Levites devoted their lives to the sanctification of God's Name. So God brought darkness upon the Egyptians for three days, and during that time God slew all the wicked Israelites, as  reports, "I will purge out from among you the rebels, and them that transgress against Me." The Levites, however, were all righteous and practiced the Torah; as  says, "For they have observed Your word, and keep Your covenant." The Midrash taught that "covenant" referred to circumcision, as  says, "This is My covenant . . . every male among you shall be circumcised." And the Midrash taught that when the Israelites made the Golden Calf, the Levites did not participate, as  says: "Then Moses stood in the gate of the camp . . . and all the sons of Levi gathered themselves together to him."

Reading the command of  that, when first appointed to office, the Levites had to cut their hair, the Gemara taught that there were three who were required to cut their hair, and whose hair cutting was a religious duty: nazirites (as stated in ), those afflicted with skin disease (metzora, as stated in ), and the Levites. Citing the Mishnah, the Gemara taught that if any of them cut their hair without a razor, or left behind two hairs, their act was invalid.

But the Sages ruled that bulls could be as many as three years old, and Rabbi Meir ruled that even those that are four or five years old were valid, but old animals were not brought out of respect.

Reading , "And the Levites shall be Mine," a Midrash taught that wherever Scripture says "to Me" or "Mine," it refers to something that shall never cease either in this world or in the World to Come.

The Mishnah deduced from  that before Moses set up the Tabernacle, the firstborn performed sacrifices, but after Moses set up the Tabernacle, priests performed the sacrifices.

The Jerusalem Talmud reported that Rabbi Tanhuma in the name of Rabbi Lazar deduced from  that the Levites' singing made atonement for the Israelites. A Baraita taught that the priests did the sacrificial service, the Levites sang on the platform while the priests offered the sacrifices, and the Israelites served as emissaries of the entire people when they attended the sacrifices. And another Baraita reported that Rabbi Simeon ben Eleazar taught that priests, Levites, Israelites, and song were all essential for an offering. Rabbi Avin said in the name of Rabbi Eleazar that  provided support for this when it says, "And all the congregation prostrated themselves," these being the Israelites; "and the singers sang," these being the Levites; "and the trumpeters sounded," these being the priests; and the conclusion of the verse, "all this continued until the burnt-offering was finished," demonstrated that all were essential to complete the offering. Rabbi Tanhuma said in the name of Rabbi Lazar that one may learn this from  "And I have given the Levites," these being the Levites; "to do the service of the children of Israel in the tent of meeting," these being the priests; "and to make atonement for the children of Israel," this being brought about by the singing; "through the children of Israel coming near to the sanctuary," these being the Israelites.

A Midrash noted that  says, "from 25 years old and upward they shall go in to perform the service in the work of the tent of meeting," while , 23, 30, 35, 39, 43, and 47 say that Levites "30 years old and upward" did service in the tent of meeting. The Midrash deduced that the difference teaches that all those five years, from the age of 25 to the age of 30, Levites served apprenticeships, and from that time onward they were allowed to draw near to do service. The Midrash concluded that a Levite could not enter the Temple courtyard to do service unless he had served an apprenticeship of five years. And the Midrash inferred from this that students who see no sign of success in their studies within a period of five years will never see any.

The Mishnah taught that a disability that did not disqualify priests disqualified Levites, and a disability that did not disqualify Levites disqualified priests. The Gemara explained that our Rabbis taught that  disqualified priests by reason of a bodily blemish, and not by reason of age; and Levites were disqualified by age, for they were qualified for service only from the age of 30 to 50, and not by bodily blemish. It follows, therefore, that the disability that does not disqualify priests disqualifies Levites, and the disability that does not disqualify Levites disqualifies priests. The Gemara taught that we know this from a Baraita in which our Rabbis noted that  says: "This is that which pertains to the Levites." From , "And from the age of 50 years they shall return from the service of the work," we know that Levites were disqualified by age. One might have argued that they were disqualified by bodily blemish too; thus, if priests who were not disqualified by age were nevertheless disqualified by bodily blemish, Levites who were disqualified by age should surely have been disqualified by bodily blemish.  therefore says: "This is that which pertains to the Levites," to instruct that "this," that is, age, only disqualifies Levites, but nothing else disqualifies them. One might also have argued that priests were disqualified by age too; thus, if Levites who were not disqualified by bodily blemish were nevertheless disqualified by age, priests who were disqualified by bodily blemish should surely have been disqualified by age.  therefore says: "Which pertains to the Levites," and not "to the priests." One might further have supposed that the rule that Levites were disqualified by age obtained even at Shiloh and at the Temple at Jerusalem, where the Levites sang in the choir and guarded the doors of the Temple.  therefore says: "To do the work of service and the work of bearing burdens," to instruct that God ordained this rule disqualifying Levites by age only when the work was that of bearing burdens upon the shoulder, the service of the Tabernacle in the wilderness, and not at the Temple at Jerusalem. Similarly, the Sifre taught that years invalidated in the case of Levites but not in the case of the priesthood. For prior to the entry into the Land of Israel, the Levites were valid from the age of 30 to the age of 50, while the priests were valid from puberty until the end of their lives. But once they came into the Land, the Levites were invalidated only by losing their voice. Elsewhere, the Sifre read , "and shall serve no more; but shall minister with their brethren in the tent of meeting, to keep the charge, but they shall do no manner of service," to teach that the Levite went back to the work of closing the doors and carrying out the tasks assigned to the sons of Gershom.

Numbers chapter 9
Rav Menasia bar Tahlifa said in Rav's name that this proved that there is no chronological order in the Torah.

The Sifre concluded that  records the disgrace of the Israelites, as  reports the only Passover that the Israelites observed in the wilderness.

Rav Naḥman bar Isaac noted that both  and  begin, "And the Lord spoke to Moses in the wilderness of Sinai," and deduced that just as  happened (in the words of that verse) "on the first day of the second month," so too  happened at the beginning of the month. And as  addressed the Passover offering, which the Israelites were to bring on the 14th of the month, the Gemara concluded that one should expound the laws of a holiday two weeks before the holiday.

Interpreting , the Mishnah taught that anyone who was "unclean by reason [of contact] with a dead body or on a distant journey" and did not observe the first Passover was obliged to observe the second Passover. Furthermore, the Mishnah taught that if anyone unintentionally erred or was prevented from observing and thus did not observe the first Passover, then that person was obliged to observe the second Passover. The Mishnah asked why then  specified that people "unclean by reason of [contact with] a dead body or on a distant journey" observed the second Passover. The Mishnah answered that it was to teach that those "unclean by reason of [contact with] a dead body or on a distant journey" were exempt from being cut off from their kin, while those who deliberately failed to observe the Passover were liable to being cut off from their kin.

Interpreting , Rabbi Akiva taught that "a distant journey" was one from Modi'in and beyond, and the same distance in any direction from Jerusalem. But Rabbi Eliezer said that a journey was distant anytime one left the threshold of the Temple Court.

The Mishnah taught that the prohibitions of  that "seven days shall there be no leaven found in your houses" and of  that "no leaven shall be seen in all your territory" applied to the first Passover; while at the second Passover, one could have both leavened and unleavened bread in one's house. And the Mishnah taught that for the first Passover, one was required to recite the Hallel when the Passover lamb was eaten; while the second Passover did not require the reciting of Hallel when the Passover lamb was eaten. But both the first and second Passovers required the reciting of Hallel when the Passover lambs were offered, and both Passover lambs were eaten roasted with unleavened bread and bitter herbs. And both the first and second Passovers took precedence over the Sabbath.

The Gemara cited their doing so to support the law that one who is engaged on one religious duty is free from any other. Rabbi Akiva said that they were Mishael and Elzaphan who were occupied with the remains of Nadab and Abihu (as reported in ). Rabbi Isaac argued, however, that if they were those who bore the coffin of Joseph or if they were Mishael and Elzaphan, they would have had time to cleanse themselves before Passover. Rather, Rabbi Isaac identified the men as some who were occupied with the obligation to bury an abandoned corpse (met mitzvah).

Abaye deduced from the words "And on the day that the tabernacle was reared up" in  that the Israelites erected the Tabernacle only during the daytime, not at night, and thus that the building of the Temple could not take place at night.

The Sifre asked how one could reconcile the report of  that "at the commandment of the Lord they journeyed" with the report of  that whenever they traveled, "Moses said: 'Rise up, O Lord.'" The Sifre compared the matter to the case of a king who told his servant to arrange things so that the king could hand over an inheritance to his son. Alternatively, the Sifre compared the matter to the case of a king who went along with his ally. As the king was setting out, he said that he would not set out until his ally came.

Numbers chapter 10

When Samuel had a bad dream, he used to quote , "The dreams speak falsely." The Gemara resolved the contradiction, teaching that , "I speak with him in a dream?" refers to dreams that come through an angel, whereas , "The dreams speak falsely," refers to dreams that come through a demon. The Gemara taught that a dream is a sixtieth part of prophecy. Rabbi Hanan taught that even if the Master of Dreams (an angel, in a dream that truly foretells the future) tells a person that on the next day the person will die, the person should not desist from prayer, for as  says, "For in the multitude of dreams are vanities and also many words, but fear God." (Although a dream may seem reliably to predict the future, it will not necessarily come true; one must place one's trust in God.) Rabbi Samuel bar Nahmani said in the name of Rabbi Jonathan that a person is shown in a dream only what is suggested by the person's own thoughts (while awake), as  says, "As for you, Oh King, your thoughts came into your mind upon your bed," and  says, "That you may know the thoughts of the heart."

Rabbi Hama bar Haninah and Rabbi Josiah disagreed about what configuration the Israelites traveled in when they traveled in the Wilderness. Refuting the other's argument, the one who said that they traveled in the shape of a beam read , "as they encamp, so shall they set forward," to teach that just as the configuration of their camp was according to God's Word, so the configuration of their journey was by God's Word. While the one who said that they traveled in the shape of a box read , "the camp of the children of Dan, which was the rearward of all the camps," to teach that Dan was more populous than the other camps, and would thus travel in the rear, and if anyone would lose any item, the camp of Dan would return it.

The Sifre deduced from the words "And the cloud of the Lord was over them by day" in  that God's cloud hovered over the people with disabilities and illnesses—including those afflicted with emissions and skins diseases that removed them from the camp proper—protecting those with special needs.

The Sages taught that inverted nuns ( ] ) bracket the verses , about how the Ark would move, to teach that the verses are not in their proper place. But Rabbi said that the nuns do not appear there on that account, but because  constitute a separate book. Rabban Simeon ben Gamaliel, however, taught that  were written where they are to provide a break between two accounts of Israel's transgressions.

Rabbi Tarfon taught that God came from Mount Sinai (or others say Mount Seir) and was revealed to the children of Esau, as  says, "The Lord came from Sinai, and rose from Seir to them," and "Seir" means the children of Esau, as  says, "And Esau dwelt in Mount Seir." God asked them whether they would accept the Torah, and they asked what was written in it. From there, God turned and was revealed to the children of Ishmael, as  says, "He shined forth from Mount Paran," and "Paran" means the children of Ishmael, as  says of Ishmael, "And he dwelt in the wilderness of Paran." God asked them whether they would accept the Torah, and they asked what was written in it. From there, God sent messengers to all the nations of the world asking them whether they would accept the Torah, and they asked what was written in it. They replied that they had no delight in the Torah, therefore let God give it to God's people, as  says, "The Lord will give strength [identified with the Torah] to His people; the Lord will bless His people with peace." From there, God returned and was revealed to the children of Israel, as  says, "And he came from the ten thousands of holy ones," and the expression "ten thousands" means the children of Israel, as  says, "And when it rested, he said, ‘Return, O Lord, to the ten thousands of the thousands of Israel.’" With God were thousands of chariots and 20,000 angels, and God’s right hand held the Torah, as  says, "At his right hand was a fiery law to them."

Numbers chapter 11
Rav and Samuel debated how to interpret the report of  that the Israelites complained: "We remember the fish, which we ate in Egypt for free." One read "fish" literally, while the other read "fish" to mean the illicit intercourse that they were "free" to have when they were in Egypt, before the commandments of Sinai. Rabbi Ammi and Rabbi Assi disputed the meaning of the report of  that the Israelites remembered the cucumbers, melons, leeks, onions, and garlic of Egypt. One said that manna had the taste of every kind of food except these five; while the other said that manna had both the taste and the substance of all foods except these, for which manna had only the taste without the substance.

The Gemara concluded that the manna fell at different places for different classes of people: For the righteous, it fell in front of their homes; for average folk, it fell just outside the camp, and they went out and gathered; and for the wicked, it fell at some distance, and they had to go about to gather it.

The Gemara concluded that the manna fell in different forms for different classes of people: For the righteous, it fell as bread; for average folk, it fell as cakes that required baking; and for the wicked, it fell as kernels that required grinding.

Rav Judah said in the name of Rav (or others say Rabbi Hama ben Hanina) that the words "ground it in mortars" in  taught that with the manna came down women's cosmetics, which were also ground in mortars. Rabbi Jose ben Hanina said that the manna tasted differently for different classes of people: It tasted like honey for infants, bread for youths, and oil for the aged.

Rabbi Eleazar, on the authority of Rabbi Simlai, noted that  says, "And I charged your judges at that time," while  similarly says, "I charged you [the Israelites] at that time." Rabbi Eleazar deduced that  meant to warn the Congregation to revere their judges, and  meant to warn the judges to be patient with the Congregation. Rabbi Hanan (or some say Rabbi Shabatai) said that this meant that judges must be as patient as Moses, who  reports acted "as the nursing father carries the sucking child."

The Midrash continued that the earlier 70 elders were consumed like Nadab and Abihu, because they too acted frivolously when (as reported in ) they beheld God and inappropriately ate and drank. The Midrash taught that Nadab, Abihu, and the 70 elders deserved to die then, but because God so loved giving the Torah, God did not wish to disturb that time.

A Midrash read , “Gather to Me 70 men,” to indicate God's assessment of the elder's worthiness. Whenever he saw that the wine was good, he would direct his men to bring the wine into his house, but when he saw that the wine had turned to vinegar, he would tell his men to take the wine into their houses.

Rabbi Hama ben Hanina taught that our ancestors were never without a scholars' council. Abraham was an elder and a member of the scholars' council, as  says, "And Abraham was an elder (zaken) well stricken in age." Eliezer, Abraham's servant, was an elder and a member of the scholars' council, as  says, "And Abraham said to his servant, the elder of his house, who ruled over all he had," which Rabbi Eleazar explained to mean that he ruled over — and thus knew and had control of — the Torah of his master. Isaac was an elder and a member of the scholars' council, as  says: "And it came to pass when Isaac was an elder (zaken)." Jacob was an elder and a member of the scholars' council, as  says, "Now the eyes of Israel were dim with age (zoken)." In Egypt they had the scholars' council, as  says, "Go and gather the elders of Israel together."

The Mishnah deduced from  that the Great Sanhedrin consisted of 71 members, because God instructed Moses to gather 70 elders of Israel, and Moses at their head made 71. Rabbi Judah said that it consisted only of 70.

Rav Aha bar Jacob argued that the words "with you" implied that the judges needed to be "like you"—that is, like Moses—in unblemished genealogical background. But the Gemara did not accept that argument.

In , Wisdom (which the Rabbis equated with the Torah) says, "By me kings reign, and princes decree justice." A Midrash taught that  thus reports what actually happened to Joshua, for as  reports, it was not the sons of Moses who succeeded their father, but Joshua. And because Joshua served his master Moses, Joshua attained the privilege of receiving the Holy Spirit, as  reports, "Now it came to pass after the death of Moses . . . that the Lord spoke to Joshua, the minister of Moses."

The Gemara concluded that God's punishment came at different speeds for different classes of people: Average people died immediately; while the wicked suffered over a month before they died.

Or if all the fish of the sea be gathered together for them, will they suffice them?" The Midrash explained by relating the case of a king who had a friend who displayed arrogance towards the king privately, using harsh words. The king did not, however, lose his temper with his friend. Later, the friend displayed his arrogance in the presence of the king's legions, and the king sentenced his friend to death. So also God told Moses that the first offense that Moses committed (in ) was a private matter between Moses and God. But now that Moses had committed a second offense against God in public, it was impossible for God to overlook it, and God had to react, as  reports, "To sanctify Me in the eyes of the children of Israel."

The Rabbis taught in a Baraita that when (in ) God told Moses to gather 70 elders of Israel, Moses worried that if he chose six from each of the 12 tribes, there would be 72 elders, two more than God requested. If he chose five elders from each tribe, there would be 60 elders, ten short of the number God requested. If Moses chose six out of some tribes and five out of others, he would sow jealousy among the tribes. To solve this problem, Moses selected six prospective elders out of each tribe. Then he brought 72 lots, on 70 of which he wrote the word "elder" and two of which he left blank. He then mixed up all the lots, put them in an urn, and asked the 72 prospective elders to draw lots. To each prospective elder who drew a lot marked "elder," Moses said that Heaven had consecrated him. To those two prospective elders who drew a blank, Moses said that Heaven had rejected them, what could Moses do? According to this Baraita, some say the report in  that Eldad and Medad remained in the camp meant that their lots — marked "elder" — remained in the urn, as Eldad and Medad were afraid to draw their lots. Other prospective elders drew the two blank lots, so Eldad and Medad were thus selected elders.

Rabbi Simeon expounded a different view on the report in  that Eldad and Medad remained in the camp. In reward for their humility, God added yet more greatness to their greatness; so while the other elders' prophesying ceased, Eldad's and Medad's prophesying continued. Rabbi Simeon taught that Eldad and Medad prophesied that Moses would die and Joshua would bring Israel into the Land of Israel. Rav Naḥman read  to teach that they prophesied concerning Gog and Magog. The Gemara taught that if Eldad and Medad prophesied that Moses would die, then that explains why Joshua in  requested Moses to forbid them. The Gemara reasoned that if Eldad and Medad prophesied about the quail or Gog and Magog, then Joshua asked Moses to forbid them because their behavior did not appear seemly, like a student who issues legal rulings in the presence of his teacher. The Gemara explained that Moses must not have heard their entire prophecy.

A Midrash taught that Eldad and Medad thought that they were not worthy to be among the 70 elders, and in reward for their humility, God gave them several rewards more than the elders: (1) Whereas the elders prophesied only for the next day, Eldad and Medad prophesied what would happen for 40 years. (2) Whereas the elders did not enter the Land, Eldad and Medad did. (3) Whereas the Torah does not tell the names of the elders, it does tell the names of Eldad and Medad. (4) Whereas the prophecy of the elders ended, as it came from Moses, the prophecy of Eldad and Medad came from God.

Numbers chapter 12
Miriam found out that Moses had ceased to have marital relations with his wife Zipporah when Miriam observed that Zipporah was not making herself up with women's ornaments. Miriam asked Zipporah why she was not making herself up like other women, and Zipporah answered that Moses did not pay any attention to such things. Thus Miriam realized that Moses has ceased having marital relations with Zipporah and told Aaron, and both Miriam and Aaron spoke against Moses. Rabbi Nathan taught that Miriam was standing alongside Zipporah when (as recounted in ) the youth ran and told Moses that Eldad and Medad were prophesying in the camp. When Zipporah heard the report, she lamented for the wives of Eldad and Medad because the men had become prophets, and the wives would thus lose their husbands’ attention. On that basis, Miriam realized the situation and told Aaron, and both of them spoke against Moses.

The Gemara cited  for the proposition that prophets had to be humble. In , Moses foretold that "A prophet will the Lord your God raise up for you . . . like me," and Rabbi Joḥanan thus taught that prophets would have to be, like Moses, strong, wealthy, wise, and humble. Strong, for  says of Moses, "he spread the tent over the tabernacle," and a Master taught that Moses himself spread it, and  reports, "Ten cubits shall be the length of a board." Wealthy, as  reports God's instruction to Moses, "Carve yourself two tablets of stone," and the Rabbis interpreted the verse to teach that the chips would belong to Moses. Wise, for Rav and Samuel both said that 50 gates of understanding were created in the world, and all but one were given to Moses, for  said of Moses, "You have made him a little lower than God." Humble, for  reports, "Now the man Moses was very humble."

The Midrash explained that Moses overheard certain Israelites scoffing behind his back, for  says, "And they (the Israelites) looked after Moses." The Midrash asked what the people would say about Moses. Rabbi Joḥanan taught that the people blessed his mother, for she never saw him, as he was always speaking with God and always wholly given over to his service. But Rabbi Hama said that they used to remark how fat and prosperous Moses looked. When Moses heard this, he vowed to give an account of everything. And this is why  says, "These are the accounts of the Tabernacle." Reading , "as they were rendered according to the commandment of Moses," the Midrash taught that the Israelites did everything that they did by the command of Moses. Even though everything was done with witnesses, as soon as the construction of the Tabernacle was completed, Moses wasted no time to promise the people the complete details of all the expenditures involved. While engaged in this calculation, Moses completely forgot about 1,775 shekalim of silver that he had used for hooks for the pillars, and he became uneasy thinking to himself that the Israelites would find grounds to say that Moses took them for himself. So God opened the eyes of Moses to realize that the silver had been converted into hooks for the pillars. When the Israelites saw that the account now completely tallied, they were completely satisfied with the integrity of the work on the Tabernacle. And thus  says, "These are the accounts of the Tabernacle," to report that the accounts balanced.

But Rabbi Samuel bar Nahmani said in the name of Rabbi Jonathan that in compensation for three pious acts that Moses did at the burning bush, he was privileged to obtain three rewards.

A Baraita taught that Moses did three things of his own understanding, and God approved: (1) He added one day of abstinence of his own understanding; (2) he separated himself from his wife (entirely, after the Revelation); and (3) he broke the Tables (on which God had written the Ten Commandments). The Gemara explained that to reach his decision to separate himself from his wife, Moses applied an a fortiori (kal va-chomer) argument to himself. Moses reasoned that if he heard from the Shechinah at all times and not only at one appointed time, how much more so should he abstain from marital contact.

It was taught in a Baraita that four types of people are accounted as though they were dead: a poor person, a person affected by skin disease (metzora), a blind person, and one who is childless. A poor person is accounted as dead, for  says, "for all the men are dead who sought your life" (and the Gemara interpreted this to mean that they had been stricken with poverty). A person affected by skin disease (metzora) is accounted as dead, for  says, "And Aaron looked upon Miriam, and behold, she was leprous (metzora'at). And Aaron said to Moses . . . let her not be as one dead." The blind are accounted as dead, for  says, "He has set me in dark places, as they that be dead of old."

Rabbi Ishmael cited  as one of ten a fortiori (kal va-chomer) recorded in the Hebrew Bible: (1) In , Joseph's brothers told Joseph, "Behold, the money that we found in our sacks' mouths we brought back to you," and they thus reasoned, "how then should we steal?" (2) In , Moses told God, "Behold, the children of Israel have not hearkened to me," and reasoned that surely all the more, "How then shall Pharaoh hear me?" (3) In , Moses said to the Israelites, "Behold, while I am yet alive with you this day, you have been rebellious against the Lord," and reasoned that it would follow, "And how much more after my death?" (4) In , "the Lord said to Moses: 'If her (Miriam's) father had but spit in her face,'" surely it would stand to reason, "'Should she not hide in shame seven days?'" (5) In , the prophet asked, "If you have run with the footmen, and they have wearied you," is it not logical to conclude, "Then how can you contend with horses?" (6) In , David's men said to him, "Behold, we are afraid here in Judah," and thus surely it stands to reason, "How much more then if we go to Keilah?" (8)  reasoned, "Behold, the righteous shall be requited in the earth," and does it not follow, "How much more the wicked and the sinner?" (9) In , "The king said to Esther the queen: 'The Jews have slain and destroyed 500 men in Shushan the castle,'" and it thus stands to reason, "'What then have they done in the rest of the king's provinces?'" (10) In , God came to the prophet saying, "Behold, when it was whole, it was usable for no work," and thus surely it is logical to argue, "How much less, when the fire has devoured it, and it is singed?"

The Mishnah cited  for the proposition that Providence treats a person measure for measure as that person treats others.

In medieval Jewish interpretation
The parashah is discussed in these medieval Jewish sources:

Numbers chapter 8
Reading , "the seven lamps shall give light in front of the Menorah," Rashbam differed with the Midrash (see "In classical rabbinic interpretation" above) and taught that Aaron would tilt the seven lamps so as to cast light upon the table.

Rashi taught that they had to undergo this sprinkling to purify those of them who had become ritually impure because of contact with the dead. And Rashi reported an interpretation by Rabbi Moses HaDarshan (the preacher) that since the Levites were submitted in atonement for the firstborn who had practiced idolatry when they worshipped the Golden Calf (in ), and  calls idol worship "sacrifices to the dead," and in  Moses called one afflicted with skin disease (tzara'at) "as one dead," and  required those afflicted with skin disease to shave, therefore God required the Levites too to shave.

 refers to duties of the Levites. Maimonides and the siddur report that the Levites would recite the Psalm for the Day in the Temple.

Numbers chapter 9
And , "and God heard," implies that God moves and takes bodily actions like human beings. Baḥya explained that necessity brought people to anthropomorphize God and describe God in terms of human attributes so that human listeners could grasp God in their minds. After doing so, people can learn that such description was only metaphorical, and that the truth is too fine, too sublime, too exalted, and too remote from the ability and powers of human minds to grasp. Baḥya advised wise thinkers to endeavor to remove the husk of the terms and their corporeality and ascend in their minds step by step to reach the true intended meaning according to the power and ability of their minds to grasp.

Numbers chapter 11
Reading the report of  that "the mixed multitude (hasafsuf) that was among them fell a lusting," Ibn Gabirol confessed poetically that one's poor mortal life, unclean thoughts, craving trinkets and baubles, was like a body with a corrupted heart plagued by a "mixed multitude."

In modern interpretation
The parashah is discussed in these modern sources:

Numbers chapter 9
Bamberger reported that the inability of Moses to handle these cases on his own troubled the Rabbis because they relied upon a worldview in which the entire Torah was revealed at Sinai with no need for subsequent revelations.

Numbers chapter 11
Professor Dennis Olson of Princeton Theological Seminary wrote that the episode illustrated the need to allow for the possibility that persons outside the institutional leadership of God's people may have genuine words and insights from God. Professor Robert Alter of the University of California, Berkeley, wrote that Moses hyperbolically expressed the sense that holding on to a monopoly of power (equated with access to God's spirit) was not what impelled him, and pointed rather to an ideal of radical spiritual egalitarianism whereby God granted access to the spirit to anyone God chose. Terence Fretheim, Professor Emeritus at Luther Seminary, wrote that Moses shared the charisma of God's spirit and wished that all God's people could receive it.

Numbers chapter 12
Professor Masha Turner, of Hebrew Union College-Jewish Institute of Religion, Jerusalem, suggested that one can read the account of Miriam and Moses’s wife sympathetically as a case in which God sides with one maligned woman — Moses’ wife — against a more powerful one — Miriam.

Commandments
According to both Maimonides and Sefer ha-Chinuch, there are 3 positive and 2 negative commandments in the parashah:

To slaughter the second Passover lamb
To eat the second Passover lamb in accordance with the Passover rituals
Not to leave the second Passover meat over until morning
Not to break any bones from the second Passover offering
To sound alarm in times of catastrophe

In the liturgy

The laws of the Passover offering in  provide an application of the second of the Thirteen Rules for interpreting the Torah in the Baraita of Rabbi Ishmael that many Jews read as part of the readings before the Pesukei dezimra prayer service. The second rule provides that similar words in different contexts invite the reader to find a connection between the two topics. The words "in its proper time" (bemoado) in  indicate that the priests needed to bring the daily offering "in its proper time," even on a Sabbath. Applying the second rule, the same words in  mean that the priests needed to bring the Passover offering "in its proper time," even on a Sabbath.

Jews sing the words "at the commandment of the Lord by the hand of Moses" (al pi Adonai b'yad Moshe) from  while looking at the raised Torah during the lifting of the Torah (Hagbahah) after the Torah reading.

The characterization of Moses as God's "trusted servant" in  finds reflection shortly after the beginning of the Kedushah section in the Sabbath morning (Shacharit) Amidah prayer.

In the Yigdal hymn, the eighth verse, "God gave His people a Torah of truth, by means of His prophet, the most trusted of His household," reflects .

Haftarah

Connection to the parashah
Both the parashah and the haftarah discuss the Menorah. Text of Zechariah shortly after that of the haftarah explains that the lights of the Menorah symbolize God's eyes, keeping watch on the earth. And in the haftarah, God's angel explains the message of Zechariah's vision of the Menorah: "Not by might, nor by power, but by My spirit, says the Lord of hosts." Both the parashah and the haftarah also discuss the purification of priests and their clothes, the parashah in the purification of the Levites and the haftarah in the purification of the High Priest Joshua.

Notes

Further reading
The parashah has parallels or is discussed in these sources:

Biblical
, 43–49 (Passover);  (Passover);  (Menorah);  (Passover);  (Menorah).
 (Passover);  (inquiry of God on the law).
 (inquiry of God on the law);  (inquiry of God on the law);  (Passover).
 (Kibroth-hattaavah);  (Passover).

Early nonrabbinic
The War Scroll. Dead Sea scroll 1QM 10:1–8a. Land of Israel, 1st century BCE. In, e.g., Géza Vermes. The Complete Dead Sea Scrolls in English, pages 161, 173. New York: Penguin Press, 1997. .
Philo. Allegorical Interpretation 1: 24:76; 2: 17:66; 3: 33:103, 59:169, 72:204; On the Birth of Abel and the Sacrifices Offered by Him and by His Brother Cain 18:66; 22:77; 26:86; That the Worse Is Wont To Attack the Better 19:63; On the Giants 6:24; On Drunkenness 10:39; On the Prayers and Curses Uttered by Noah When He Became Sober 4:19; On the Migration of Abraham 28:155; Who Is the Heir of Divine Things? 5:20; 15:80; 52:262; On the Change of Names 39:232; On Dreams, That They Are God-Sent 2:7:49; On the Life of Moses 2:42:230; The Special Laws 4:24:128–30; Questions and Answers on Genesis 1:91. Alexandria, Egypt, early 1st century CE. In, e.g., The Works of Philo: Complete and Unabridged, New Updated Edition. Translated by Charles Duke Yonge, pages 33, 45, 62, 69, 73, 102, 104–05, 119, 153, 210, 229, 268, 277, 282, 299, 361, 391, 511, 629, 810. Peabody, Massachusetts: Hendrickson Publishers, 1993. .
Josephus, Antiquities of the Jews 3:12:5– 13:1. Circa 93–94. In, e.g., The Works of Josephus: Complete and Unabridged, New Updated Edition. Translated by William Whiston, pages 98–99. Peabody, Massachusetts: Hendrickson Publishers, 1987. .
John  ("Not one of his bones will be broken") 90–100 CE.

Classical rabbinic
Mishnah: Pesachim 1:1–10:9; Beitzah 1:1–5:7; Sotah 1:7–9; Sanhedrin 1:6; Zevachim 14:4; Keritot 1:1; Tamid 3:9; Negaim 14:4; Parah 1:2. Land of Israel, circa 200 CE. In, e.g., The Mishnah: A New Translation. Translated by Jacob Neusner, pages 229–51, 449, 584, 731, 836, 867, 1010, 1013. New Haven: Yale University Press, 1988. .
Tosefta: Bikkurim 1:2; Pisha (Pesachim) 1:1–10:13; Shekalim 3:26; Yom Tov (Beitzah) 1:1–4:11; Sotah 4:2–4; 6:7–8; 7:18; Keritot 1:1; Parah 1:1–3; Yadayim 2:10. Land of Israel, circa 300 CE. In, e.g., The Tosefta: Translated from the Hebrew, with a New Introduction. Translated by Jacob Neusner, volume 1, pages 345, 471–522, 538, 585–604, 845, 857–58, 865; volume 2, pages 1551, 1745–46, 1907. Peabody, Massachusetts: Hendrickson Publishers, 2002. .
Sifre to Numbers 59:1–106:3. Land of Israel, circa 250–350 CE. In, e.g., Sifré to Numbers: An American Translation and Explanation. Translated by Jacob Neusner, volume 2, pages 1–132. Atlanta: Scholars Press, 1986. .
Sifri Zutta Beha'alotekha. Land of Israel, late 4th century CE. In, e.g., Sifré Zutta to Numbers. Translated by Jacob Neusner, pages 65–133. Lanham, Maryland: University Press of America, 2009. .
Jerusalem Talmud: Berakhot 45a; Bikkurim 4b, 11b; Eruvin 35b; Pesachim 1a–86a; Yoma 7a, 41b; Sukkah 31a; Beitzah 1a–49b; Rosh Hashanah 1b, 2b, 20b, 22a; Taanit 20b, 22b, 27a; Megillah 14a, 17b, 29a; Moed Katan 11b, 17a; Chagigah 21b; Nazir 20b, 41b, 49a–b; Sotah 8a; Kiddushin 22a; Sanhedrin 10a–b, 22b, 63b; Shevuot 13b, 23b; Horayot 4b, 15a. Tiberias, Land of Israel, circa 400 CE. In, e.g., Talmud Yerushalmi. Edited by Chaim Malinowitz, Yisroel Simcha Schorr, and Mordechai Marcus, volumes 1, 12, 17–19, 21–28, 34–36, 40, 44–46, 49. Brooklyn: Mesorah Publications, 2005–2019. And in, e.g., The Jerusalem Talmud: A Translation and Commentary. Edited by Jacob Neusner and translated by Jacob Neusner, Tzvee Zahavy, B. Barry Levy, and Edward Goldman. Peabody, Massachusetts: Hendrickson Publishers, 2009.
Genesis Rabbah 1:1, 11; 7:2; 31:8; 45:5; 48:10, 16; 49:2; 60:13; 64:8; 65:18; 66:7; 71:6; 92:7; 96 (NV); 97 (NV); 96; 97:3; 99:5–6; 100:7. Land of Israel, 5th century. In, e.g., Midrash Rabbah: Genesis. Translated by Harry Freedman and Maurice Simon, volume 1, pages 1, 11, 50, 242, 382–83, 411–12, 416, 420; volume 2, pages 536, 578, 593–94, 605, 657, 853, 895, 898, 922, 940, 977–78, 993. London: Soncino Press, 1939. .
Mekhilta of Rabbi Simeon 5:2; 12:3; 16:2; 20:5; 22:2–23:1; 29:1; 37:1–2; 40:1–2; 43:1; 44:2; 47:2. Land of Israel, 5th century. In, e.g., Mekhilta de-Rabbi Shimon bar Yohai. Translated by W. David Nelson, pages 14, 41, 55, 85, 98, 100, 102, 131, 159, 162, 170–72, 182, 186, 209. Philadelphia: Jewish Publication Society, 2006. .
Leviticus Rabbah 1:4, 14; 2:2, 4; 7:3; 9:1; 10:2; 11:3; 15:8; 16:1, 5; 17:3; 18:4; 20:10; 31:2. Land of Israel, 5th century. In, e.g., Midrash Rabbah: Leviticus. Translated by Harry Freedman and Maurice Simon, volume 4, pages 8, 17, 21, 22–24, 93, 107, 123, 137, 196, 201, 207, 217, 232, 261, 396. London: Soncino Press, 1939. .

Babylonian Talmud: Berakhot 7a, 32a, 34a, 54b, 55b, 63b; Shabbat 31b, 87a, 115b–16a, 130a; Eruvin 2a, 40a; Pesachim 6b, 28b, 36a, 59a, 64a, 66a–67a, 69a–b, 77a, 79a, 80a, 85a, 90a–b, 91b, 92b–96b, 115a, 120a; Yoma 3b, 7a, 28b, 51a, 66a, 75a–76a; Sukkah 25a–b, 47b, 53a–54a, 55a; Beitzah 2a–40b; Rosh Hashanah 3a, 5a, 18a, 26b–27a, 32a, 34a; Taanit 7a, 29a, 30b; Megillah 5a, 21b, 31a; Moed Katan 5a, 15b, 16a–b; Chagigah 5b, 18b, 25b; Yevamot 63b, 103b; Ketubot 57b; Nedarim 38a, 64b; Nazir 5a, 15b, 40a, 63a; Sotah 9b, 33b; Gittin 60a–b; Kiddushin 32b, 37b, 76b; Bava Kamma 25a, 83a; Bava Metzia 86b; Bava Batra 91a, 111a, 121b; Sanhedrin 2a, 3b, 8a, 17a, 36b, 47a, 110a; Makkot 10a, 13b, 14b, 17a, 21a; Shevuot 15b, 16b; Avodah Zarah 5a, 24b; Horayot 4b, 5b; Zevachim 9b, 10b, 22b, 55a, 69b, 79a, 89b, 101b, 106b; Menachot 28a–b, 29a, 65b, 83b, 95a, 98b; Chullin 7b, 17a, 24a, 27b, 29a, 30a, 105a, 129b; Bekhorot 4b, 33a; Arakhin 10a, 11a–b, 15b; Keritot 2a, 7b. Sasanian Empire, 6th century. In, e.g., Talmud Bavli. Edited by Yisroel Simcha Schorr, Chaim Malinowitz, and Mordechai Marcus, 72 volumes. Brooklyn: Mesorah Pubs., 2006.

Medieval
Pirkei De-Rabbi Eliezer, chapters 19, 41, 53. Early 9th century. In, e.g., Pirke de Rabbi Eliezer. Translated and annotated by Gerald Friedlander, pages 141, 320, 429–30, 433–36. London, 1916. Reprinted New York: Hermon Press, 1970. .
Deuteronomy Rabbah 1:10–11; 2:2–3; 3:15; 6:11–13; 9:2; 11:10. Land of Israel, 9th century. In, e.g., Midrash Rabbah: Deuteronomy. Translated by Harry Freedman and Maurice Simon, volume 7, pages 10–11, 31–32, 86, 127, 129–30, 158, 181, 187. London: Soncino Press, 1939. .
Saadia Gaon. The Book of Beliefs and Opinions, 2:10–11; 3:8–9; 5:3, 7; 9:8. Baghdad, 933. Translated by Samuel Rosenblatt, pages 116, 119, 127, 165, 170, 214, 230, 349. New Haven: Yale Univ. Press, 1948. .
Rashi. Commentary. Numbers 8–12. Troyes, France, late 11th century. In, e.g., Rashi. The Torah: With Rashi's Commentary Translated, Annotated, and Elucidated. Translated and annotated by Yisrael Isser Zvi Herczeg, volume 4, pages 87–145. Brooklyn: Mesorah Publications, 1997. .
Solomon ibn Gabirol. A Crown for the King, chapter 33, line 421. Spain, 11th century. Translated by David R. Slavitt, pages 56–57. New York: Oxford University Press, 1998. . ("mixed multitude" (asafsuf)).

Rashbam. Commentary on the Torah. Troyes, early 12th century. In, e.g., Rashbam’s Commentary on Leviticus and Numbers: An Annotated Translation. Edited and translated by Martin I. Lockshin, pages 181–204. Providence: Brown Judaic Studies, 2001. .
Judah Halevi. Kuzari. 2:26; 4:3, 11; 5:27. Toledo, Spain, 1130–1140. In, e.g., Jehuda Halevi. Kuzari: An Argument for the Faith of Israel. Introduction by Henry Slonimsky, pages 102, 200–01, 212, 217, 295. New York: Schocken, 1964. .
Numbers Rabbah 15:1–25. 12th century. In, e.g., Midrash Rabbah: Numbers. Translated by Judah J. Slotki. London: Soncino Press, 1939. .
Abraham ibn Ezra. Commentary on the Torah. Mid-12th century. In, e.g., Ibn Ezra's Commentary on the Pentateuch: Numbers (Ba-Midbar). Translated and annotated by H. Norman Strickman and Arthur M. Silver, pages 56–100. New York: Menorah Publishing Company, 1999. .
Maimonides. Mishneh Torah: Hilchot Kli Hamikdash (The Laws of Temple Utensils), chapter 3, ¶ 7. Egypt. Circa 1170–1180. In, e.g., Mishneh Torah: Sefer Ha’Avodah: The Book of (Temple) Service. Translated by Eliyahu Touger. New York: Moznaim Publishing, 2007. .

Maimonides. The Guide for the Perplexed, part 1, chapters 3–4, 10, 24, 30, 40, 45, 47, 54; part 2, chapters 24, 30, 36, 41, 45; part 3, chapters 2, 32, 36, 50. Cairo, Egypt, 1190. In, e.g., Moses Maimonides. The Guide for the Perplexed. Translated by Michael Friedländer, pages 3, 17–18, 23, 34, 39, 55, 58, 63, 75, 198, 214, 225, 234–35, 242, 245, 254, 324, 331, 383. New York: Dover Publications, 1956. .
Hezekiah ben Manoah. Hizkuni. France, circa 1240. In, e.g., Chizkiyahu ben Manoach. Chizkuni: Torah Commentary. Translated and annotated by Eliyahu Munk, volume 3, pages 880–914. Jerusalem: Ktav Publishers, 2013. .
Naḥmanides. Commentary on the Torah. Jerusalem, circa 1270. In, e.g., Ramban (Nachmanides): Commentary on the Torah: Numbers. Translated by Charles B. Chavel, volume 4, pages 68–117. New York: Shilo Publishing House, 1975. .

Zohar, part 1, pages 6b, 76a, 148a, 171a, 176b, 183a, 243a, 249b; part 2, pages 21a, 54a, 62b, 82b, 86b, 130a, 196b, 203b, 205b, 224b, 241a; part 3, pages 118b, 127a–b, 146b, 148b–56b, 198b; Raya Mehemna 42b. Spain, late 13th century. In, e.g., The Zohar. Translated by Harry Sperling and Maurice Simon. 5 volumes. London: Soncino Press, 1934.
Jacob ben Asher (Baal Ha-Turim). Rimze Ba'al ha-Turim. Early 14th century. In, e.g., Baal Haturim Chumash: Bamidbar/Numbers. Translated by Eliyahu Touger, edited and annotated by Avie Gold, volume 4, pages 1443–505. Brooklyn: Mesorah Publications, 2003. . 
Jacob ben Asher. Perush Al ha-Torah. Early 14th century. In, e.g., Yaakov ben Asher. Tur on the Torah. Translated and annotated by Eliyahu Munk, volume3 pages 1045–78. Jerusalem: Lambda Publishers, 2005. .
Isaac ben Moses Arama. Akedat Yizhak (The Binding of Isaac). Late 15th century. In, e.g., Yitzchak Arama. Akeydat Yitzchak: Commentary of Rabbi Yitzchak Arama on the Torah. Translated and condensed by Eliyahu Munk, volume 2, pages 699–713. New York, Lambda Publishers, 2001. .

Modern
Isaac Abravanel. Commentary on the Torah. Italy, between 1492–1509. In, e.g., Abarbanel: Selected Commentaries on the Torah: Volume 4: Bamidbar/Numbers. Translated and annotated by Israel Lazar, pages 72–115. Brooklyn: CreateSpace, 2015. .
Obadiah ben Jacob Sforno. Commentary on the Torah. Venice, 1567. In, e.g., Sforno: Commentary on the Torah. Translation and explanatory notes by Raphael Pelcovitz, pages 682–707. Brooklyn: Mesorah Publications, 1997. .
Moshe Alshich. Commentary on the Torah. Safed, circa 1593. In, e.g., Moshe Alshich. Midrash of Rabbi Moshe Alshich on the Torah. Translated and annotated by Eliyahu Munk, volume 3, pages 814–41. New York, Lambda Publishers, 2000. .

Avraham Yehoshua Heschel. Commentaries on the Torah. Cracow, Poland, mid-17th century. Compiled as Chanukat HaTorah. Edited by Chanoch Henoch Erzohn. Piotrkow, Poland, 1900. In Avraham Yehoshua Heschel. Chanukas HaTorah: Mystical Insights of Rav Avraham Yehoshua Heschel on Chumash. Translated by Avraham Peretz Friedman, pages 247–54. Southfield, Michigan: Targum Press/Feldheim Publishers, 2004. . 
Thomas Hobbes. Leviathan, 3:34, 36, 40, 42. England, 1651. Reprint edited by C. B. Macpherson, pages 432, 460, 462, 464, 505, 595. Harmondsworth, England: Penguin Classics, 1982. .

Shabbethai Bass. Sifsei Chachamim. Amsterdam, 1680. In, e.g., Sefer Bamidbar: From the Five Books of the Torah: Chumash: Targum Okelos: Rashi: Sifsei Chachamim: Yalkut: Haftaros, translated by Avrohom Y. Davis, pages 130–206. Lakewood Township, New Jersey: Metsudah Publications, 2013.
Chaim ibn Attar. Ohr ha-Chaim. Venice, 1742. In Chayim ben Attar. Or Hachayim: Commentary on the Torah. Translated by Eliyahu Munk, volume 4, pages 1383–442. Brooklyn: Lambda Publishers, 1999. .

Hirschel Levin. "Sermon on Be-Ha'aloteka." London, 1757 or 1758. In Marc Saperstein. Jewish Preaching, 1200–1800: An Anthology, pages 347–58. New Haven: Yale University Press, 1989. .
George Eliot. Adam Bede, chapter 50. Edinburgh and London: William Blackwood and Sons, 1859. Reprinted, e.g., edited by Carol A. Martin, page 440. Oxford: Oxford University Press, 2008. (Echoing , Dinah tells Adam, “even the man Moses, the meekest of men, was wrathful sometimes.”).

Samuel David Luzzatto (Shadal). Commentary on the Torah. Padua, 1871. In, e.g., Samuel David Luzzatto. Torah Commentary. Translated and annotated by Eliyahu Munk, volume 3, pages 1029–42. New York: Lambda Publishers, 2012. .
Yehudah Aryeh Leib Alter. Sefat Emet. Góra Kalwaria (Ger), Poland, before 1906. Excerpted in The Language of Truth: The Torah Commentary of Sefat Emet. Translated and interpreted by Arthur Green, pages 229–34. Philadelphia: Jewish Publication Society, 1998. . Reprinted 2012. .
Louis Ginzberg. Legends of the Jews, volume 3, pages 455–97. Philadelphia: Jewish Publication Society, 1911.

Hermann Cohen. Religion of Reason: Out of the Sources of Judaism. Translated with an introduction by Simon Kaplan; introductory essays by Leo Strauss, pages 77, 87, 266, 347, 425. New York: Ungar, 1972. Reprinted Atlanta: Scholars Press, 1995. . Originally published as Religion der Vernunft aus den Quellen des Judentums. Leipzig: Gustav Fock, 1919.
Alexander Alan Steinbach. Sabbath Queen: Fifty-four Bible Talks to the Young Based on Each Portion of the Pentateuch, pages 113–16. New York: Behrman's Jewish Book House, 1936.

Julius H. Greenstone. Numbers: With Commentary: The Holy Scriptures, pages 79–127. Philadelphia: Jewish Publication Society, 1939. Reprinted by Literary Licensing, 2011. .
Saul Lieberman. "Critical Marks in the Hebrew Bible — The Inverted Nuns." In Hellenism in Jewish Palestine: Studies in the Literary Transmission Beliefs and Manners of Palestine in the I Century B.C.E.–IV Century C.E., page 38. New York: The Jewish Theological Seminary of America, 1950.
Abraham Joshua Heschel. The Sabbath. New York: Farrar, Straus and Giroux, 1951. Reprinted 2005. .

Carol L. Meyers. The Tabernacle Menorah. Missoula, Montana: Scholars Press, 1976.
Peter C. Craigie. The Problem of War in the Old Testament, page 36. Grand Rapids, Michigan: William B. Eerdmans Publishing Company, 1978. .
Philip J. Budd. Word Biblical Commentary: Volume 5: Numbers, pages 85–139. Waco, Texas: Word Books, 1984. .
Joel Roth. "On the Ordination of Women as Rabbis." New York: Rabbinical Assembly, 1984. HM 7.4.1984b. In Responsa: 1980–1990: The Committee on Jewish Law and Standards of the Conservative Movement. Edited by David J. Fine, pages 736, 741–42, 764, 773 note 38, 786 note 133. New York: Rabbinical Assembly, 2005. . (women's observance of commandments and role as witnesses).
Pinchas H. Peli. Torah Today: A Renewed Encounter with Scripture, pages 165–68. Washington, D.C.: B'nai B'rith Books, 1987. .
Phyllis Trible. "Bringing Miriam Out of the Shadows." Bible Review, volume 5 (number 1) (February 1989).
Elliot N. Dorff. "A Jewish Approach to End-Stage Medical Care." New York: Rabbinical Assembly, 1990. YD 339:1.1990b. In Responsa: 1980–1990: The Committee on Jewish Law and Standards of the Conservative Movement. Edited by David J. Fine, pages 519, 535, 567 note 23. New York: Rabbinical Assembly, 2005. . (the prayer of Moses in Numbers 11:15 and the endurance of pain).
Jacob Milgrom. The JPS Torah Commentary: Numbers: The Traditional Hebrew Text with the New JPS Translation, pages 59–99, 367–87. Philadelphia: Jewish Publication Society, 1990. .
Mark S. Smith. The Early History of God: Yahweh and the Other Deities in Ancient Israel, pages 2, 10, 29, 97, 101, 112, 162. New York: HarperSanFrancisco, 1990. .
Baruch A. Levine. Numbers 1–20, volume 4, pages 267–343. New York: Anchor Bible, 1993. .
Mary Douglas. In the Wilderness: The Doctrine of Defilement in the Book of Numbers, pages 58–59, 80, 84, 86, 103, 107, 109–12, 120–21, 123–26, 135–38, 141, 143, 145, 147, 167, 175, 186, 188–90, 192, 195–98, 200–01, 209–10. Oxford: Oxford University Press, 1993. Reprinted 2004. .
Bernhard W. Anderson. "Miriam's Challenge: Why was Miriam severely punished for challenging Moses' authority while Aaron got off scot-free? There is no way to avoid the fact that the story presupposes a patriarchal society." Bible Review, volume 10 (number 3) (June 1994).
Judith S. Antonelli. "Remember Miriam." In In the Image of God: A Feminist Commentary on the Torah, pages 348–51. Northvale, New Jersey: Jason Aronson, 1995. .
Elliot N. Dorff. "Family Violence." New York: Rabbinical Assembly, 1995. HM 424.1995. In Responsa: 1991–2000: The Committee on Jewish Law and Standards of the Conservative Movement. Edited by Kassel Abelson and David J. Fine, pages 773, 806. New York: Rabbinical Assembly, 2002. . (laws of slander).
Phyllis Trible. "Eve and Miriam: From the Margins to the Center." In Feminist Approaches to the Bible: Symposium at the Smithsonian Institution September 24, 1994. Biblical Archaeology Society, 1995. .
Ellen Frankel. The Five Books of Miriam: A Woman’s Commentary on the Torah, pages 207–14. New York: G. P. Putnam's Sons, 1996. .
W. Gunther Plaut. The Haftarah Commentary, pages 347–56. New York: UAHC Press, 1996. .
Robert Goodman. “Shabbat” and “Pesach.” In Teaching Jewish Holidays: History, Values, and Activities, pages 1–19, 153–72. Denver: A.R.E. Publishing, 1997. .
Sorel Goldberg Loeb and Barbara Binder Kadden. Teaching Torah: A Treasury of Insights and Activities, pages 242–47. Denver: A.R.E. Publishing, 1997. .
Hershel Shanks. "Insight: Does the Bible refer to God as feminine?" Bible Review, volume 14 (number 2) (April 1998).

Susan Freeman. Teaching Jewish Virtues: Sacred Sources and Arts Activities, pages 8–25. Springfield, New Jersey: A.R.E. Publishing, 1999. ..
Elie Wiesel. "Supporting Roles: Eldad and Medad." Bible Review, volume 15 (number 2) (April 1999).
Robert R. Stieglitz. "The Lowdown on the Riffraff: Do these obscure figures preserve a memory of a historical Exodus?" Bible Review, volume 15 (number 4) (August 1999).
J. Daniel Hays. "Moses: The private man behind the public leader." Bible Review, volume 16 (number 4) (August 2000): pages 16–26, 60–63.
Dennis T. Olson. "Numbers." In The HarperCollins Bible Commentary. Edited by James L. Mays, pages 171–74. New York: HarperCollins Publishers, revised edition, 2000. .
Ruth H. Sohn. "The Silencing of Miriam." In The Women's Torah Commentary: New Insights from Women Rabbis on the 54 Weekly Torah Portions. Edited by Elyse Goldstein, pages 270–78. Woodstock, Vermont: Jewish Lights Publishing, 2000. .
Elie Kaplan Spitz. "Mamzerut." New York: Rabbinical Assembly, 2000. EH 4.2000a. In Responsa: 1991–2000: The Committee on Jewish Law and Standards of the Conservative Movement. Edited by Kassel Abelson and David J. Fine, 558, 578. New York: Rabbinical Assembly, 2002. . (Miriam's speaking ill and leprosy).
Lainie Blum Cogan and Judy Weiss. Teaching Haftarah: Background, Insights, and Strategies, pages 587–97. Denver: A.R.E. Publishing, 2002. .
Michael Fishbane. The JPS Bible Commentary: Haftarot, pages 222–29. Philadelphia: Jewish Publication Society, 2002. .
Robert Alter. The Five Books of Moses: A Translation with Commentary, pages 721–44. New York: W.W. Norton & Co., 2004. .

Nili S. Fox. "Numbers." In The Jewish Study Bible. Edited by Adele Berlin and Marc Zvi Brettler, pages 301–09. New York: Oxford University Press, 2004. .
Margot Stein. "Haftarat Behalotecha: Zechariah 2:14–4:7." In The Women's Haftarah Commentary: New Insights from Women Rabbis on the 54 Weekly Haftarah Portions, the 5 Megillot & Special Shabbatot. Edited by Elyse Goldstein, pages 171–74. Woodstock, Vermont: Jewish Lights Publishing, 2004. .
Marek Halter. Zipporah, Wife of Moses. New York: Crown, 2005. .
Professors on the Parashah: Studies on the Weekly Torah Reading Edited by Leib Moscovitz, pages 243–48. Jerusalem: Urim Publications, 2005. .
W. Gunther Plaut. The Torah: A Modern Commentary: Revised Edition. Revised edition edited by David E.S. Stern, pages 950–76. New York: Union for Reform Judaism, 2006. .
Suzanne A. Brody. "Mocking Birds." In Dancing in the White Spaces: The Yearly Torah Cycle and More Poems, page 95. Shelbyville, Kentucky: Wasteland Press, 2007. .

James L. Kugel. How To Read the Bible: A Guide to Scripture, Then and Now, pages 109, 159, 328–30, 407, 438, 441, 533. New York: Free Press, 2007. .
The Torah: A Women's Commentary. Edited by Tamara Cohn Eskenazi and Andrea L. Weiss, pages 843–68. New York: URJ Press, 2008. .
Simeon Chavel. "The Second Passover, Pilgrimage, and the Centralized Cult." Harvard Theological Review, volume 102 (number 1) (January 2009): pages 1–24.
R. Dennis Cole. "Numbers." In Zondervan Illustrated Bible Backgrounds Commentary. Edited by John H. Walton, volume 1, pages 351–58. Grand Rapids, Michigan: Zondervan, 2009. .
Steve Gutow. "Setting the Stage for Pluralistic Judaism: Parashat Beha’alotecha (Numbers 8:1–12:16)." In Torah Queeries: Weekly Commentaries on the Hebrew Bible. Edited by Gregg Drinkwater, Joshua Lesser, and David Shneer; foreword by Judith Plaskow, pages 197–98. New York: New York University Press, 2009. .
Reuven Hammer. Entering Torah: Prefaces to the Weekly Torah Portion, pages 207–11. New York: Gefen Publishing House, 2009. .
Alicia Jo Rabins. "Snow/Scorpions and Spiders." In Girls in Trouble. New York: JDub Music, 2009. (song about Miriam's being shut out of the camp for seven days).
Terence E. Fretheim. "Numbers." In The New Oxford Annotated Bible: New Revised Standard Version with the Apocrypha: An Ecumenical Study Bible. Edited by Michael D. Coogan, Marc Z. Brettler, Carol A. Newsom, and Pheme Perkins, pages 201–08. New York: Oxford University Press, Revised 4th Edition 2010. .
The Commentators' Bible: Numbers: The JPS Miqra'ot Gedolot. Edited, translated, and annotated by Michael Carasik, pages 55–89. Philadelphia: Jewish Publication Society, 2011. .

Calum Carmichael. "Joseph and Moses as Sources of Discord." In The Book of Numbers: A Critique of Genesis, pages 54–67. New Haven: Yale University Press, 2012. .
Shmuel Herzfeld. "Father’s Day." In Fifty-Four Pick Up: Fifteen-Minute Inspirational Torah Lessons, pages 204–08. Jerusalem: Gefen Publishing House, 2012. .
Daniel S. Nevins. "The Use of Electrical and Electronic Devices on Shabbat." New York: Rabbinical Assembly, 2012.

Shlomo Riskin. Torah Lights: Bemidbar: Trials and Tribulations in Times of Transition, pages 59–87. New Milford, Connecticut: Maggid Books, 2012. .
Shai Cherry. "Second Chance Seder: Our sages acknowledge and validate the alienation and disaffection we sometimes feel." The Jerusalem Report, volume 24 (number 4) (May 22, 2013): page 45.
Janson C. Condren. “Is the Account of the Organization of the Camp Devoid of Organization? A Proposal for the Literary Structure of Numbers 1.1–10.10.” Journal for the Study of the Old Testament, volume 37 (number 4) (June 2013): pages 423–52.
Amanda Terkel. "Glenn Grothman, Wisconsin GOP Senator, Fights for a Seven-Day Workweek." The Huffington Post. (January 3, 2014, updated January 23, 2014). (Congressional candidate said, "Right now in Wisconsin, you're not supposed to work seven days in a row, which is a little ridiculous because all sorts of people want to work seven days a week.")
Ester Bloom. "The Crazy New App for Using Your iPhone on Shabbos."  Jewniverse. (October 1, 2014).

Jonathan Sacks. Lessons in Leadership: A Weekly Reading of the Jewish Bible, pages 193–97. New Milford, Connecticut: Maggid Books, 2015. .
Avivah Gottlieb Zornberg. Bewilderments: Reflections on the Book of Numbers, pages 63–118. New York: Schocken Books, 2015. .
"The Crazy New Invention for Using Electricity on Shabbat."  Jewniverse. (April 21, 2015).
Jonathan Sacks. Essays on Ethics: A Weekly Reading of the Jewish Bible, pages 227–31. New Milford, Connecticut: Maggid Books, 2016. .
Shai Held. The Heart of Torah, Volume 2: Essays on the Weekly Torah Portion: Leviticus, Numbers, and Deuteronomy, pages 114–23. Philadelphia: Jewish Publication Society, 2017. .
Steven Levy and Sarah Levy. The JPS Rashi Discussion Torah Commentary, pages 120–22. Philadelphia: Jewish Publication Society, 2017. .
Pekka Pitkänen. “Ancient Israelite Population Economy: Ger, Toshav, Nakhri and Karat as Settler Colonial Categories.” Journal for the Study of the Old Testament, volume 42 (number 2) (December 2017): pages 139–53.
Jonathan Sacks. Numbers: The Wilderness Years: Covenant & Conversation: A Weekly Reading of the Jewish Bible, pages 107–44. New Milford, Connecticut: Maggid Books, 2017. .
Michael Shelomo Bar-Ron. “A Notice About Manna and Uprooted Oppression at Serabit el-Khadim (Improved).” (2020).

External links

Texts
Masoretic text and 1917 JPS translation
Hear the parashah chanted
Hear the parashah read in Hebrew

Commentaries

Academy for Jewish Religion, California
Academy for Jewish Religion, New York
Aish.com
Akhlah: The Jewish Children's Learning Network
Aleph Beta Academy
Alicia Jo Rabins
American Jewish University — Ziegler School of Rabbinic Studies
Anshe Emes Synagogue, Los Angeles
Ari Goldwag
Ascent of Safed
Bar-Ilan University
Chabad.org
eparsha.com
G-dcast
The Israel Koschitzky Virtual Beit Midrash
Jewish Agency for Israel
Jewish Theological Seminary
Kabbala Online
Mechon Hadar
Miriam Aflalo
MyJewishLearning.com
Ohr Sameach
Orthodox Union
OzTorah, Torah from Australia
Oz Ve Shalom — Netivot Shalom
Pardes from Jerusalem
Rabbi Dov Linzer
Professor James L. Kugel
Professor Michael Carasik
Rabbi Eliezer Melamed
Rabbi Fabian Werbin
Rabbi Jonathan Sacks
RabbiShimon.com
Rabbi Shlomo Riskin
Rabbi Shmuel Herzfeld
Rabbi Stan Levin
Reconstructionist Judaism 
Sephardic Institute
Shiur.com
613.org Jewish Torah Audio
Tanach Study Center
TheTorah.com
Torah from Dixie
Torah.org
TorahVort.com
Union for Reform Judaism
United Synagogue of Conservative Judaism
What's Bothering Rashi?
Yeshiva University
Yeshivat Chovevei Torah

Weekly Torah readings in Sivan
Weekly Torah readings from Numbers